Pigs 2: The Last Blood is a Polish crime thriller directed by Władysław Pasikowski. The film was released on 5 April 1994, is a sequel to 1992's Pigs, and was followed by 2020's Pigs 3.

Plot

Poland in 1994. Franciszek Maurer ("Franz") is released from prison. He finds employment with Radosław Wolf, an arms dealer who just returned from Serbia. Maurer pulls to the gang former police colleague, "Nowy". Franz does not know that the whole time Nowy maintains contact with Major Bień. When Franz, Wolf and Nowy have to organize a transport of weapons to Sarajevo by trucks. Franz informs the police about the planned transport. At the last moment the heads of the gang change the plan to use a train instead. Franz has to stop the weapons-loaded train by himself.

Cast
 Bogusław Linda – Franciszek "Franz" Maurer
 Cezary Pazura – Waldemar "Nowy" Morawiec
 Artur Żmijewski – Radosław Wolf
 Magdalena Dandourian – Nadia
 Valery Prijomychov – Sawczuk
 Zbigniew Bielski – Kaniewski
 Aleksander Bednarz – Major Bień
 Edward Linde-Lubaszenko - Stopczyk
 Jan Machulski - Walenda
 Sławomir Sulej – Wyrek
 Jerzy Zelnik – Sarzyński
 Tomasz Dedek – Wawro, subordinate of major Bień
 Sergey Shakurov – Colonel Jakuszyn
 Piotr Zaichenko – Ganz
 Iwona Katarzyna Pawlak – Mariola Morawiec
 Ryszard Kotys – train driver
 Mariusz Pilawski – waiter
 Tomasz Jarosz – car thief
 Robert Więckiewicz – car thief
 Denis Delic – Serb

Reception

The film was the highest-grossing Polish film of the year with 700,000 admissions and fourth overall in Poland for 1994.

References

External links
 

1994 films
1990s Polish-language films
Polish crime films
Films directed by Wladyslaw Pasikowski